Žarko Dragojević (born 5 May 1954) is a Serbian film director and screenwriter.

He spent most of his career in Yugoslav television, but he also directed a couple of acclaimed feature films, including The House by the Railway Tracks, which won him both the Golden Arena for Best Director and the Golden Arena for Best Screenplay at the Yugoslav Film awards in 1988.

References

External links

1954 births
Living people
Serbian film directors
Serbian screenwriters
Male screenwriters
Golden Arena for Best Director winners
People from Prokuplje
Yugoslav film directors